Sampul (Shanpulu; ; , formerly  / ) is a town in Lop County (Luopu), Hotan Prefecture, Xinjiang, China.

History

Local inhabitants at Sampul cemetery around  where art such as the Sampul tapestry has been found, buried their dead from roughly 217 BCE to 283 CE. The analysis of mtDNA haplogroup distribution showed that the Sampula inhabitants had a large mixture of East Asian, Persian and European characteristics. According to Chengzhi et al. (2007), analysis of maternal mitochondrial DNA of the human remains has revealed genetic affinities at the maternal side to Ossetians and Iranians, an Eastern-Mediterranean paternal lineage.

The Sampul tapestry was discovered in Sampul in the mid-1980s.

On October 21, 2014, Sampul township disestablished and Sampul town was created.

In 2016–17, five villages were added to Sampul.

On the afternoon of April 7, 2017, the XUAR Judiciary Office's de-extremization propaganda team began three days of de-extremization lectures in the county including visits in Sampul.

On December 13, 2019, the body of a 5 year old Uyghur boy was found in snow in a stream in Sampul, and viral video of the discovery led to international attention.

Administrative divisions

, Sampul included thirty-one villages (Mandarin Chinese Hanyu Pinyin-derived names, except where Uyghur is provided):

Arimaili
Xianbaibazha
Köchken (Kuoqikan, Kuoqikancun;  / ) 
Lengger (Langan, Langancun;  / ) 
Kilente (Kelante, Kelantecun;  / ) 
Aydingköl (Ayidingkule, Ayiding Kulecun;  / ) 
Bash medris (Bashi'airike, Bashi Airikecun;  / , or Bashi'akemaidirisi ) 
Ayagh medris (Ayake'airike;  / , or Ayake'akemaidirisi, Ayake Akemai Dirisicun ) 
Chaqpi mark (Qiakemake, Qiake Makecun;  / ) 
Jay'ëriq (Jiayi'airike, Jiayi Airikecun;  / ) 
Qurbagh (Ku'erbage, Ku’er Bagecun;  / ) 
Qotaz (Kuotazilangan;  / )
Ildam (Yiledamu, Yiledamucun;  / ) 
Bashikeyikuo
Qumbagh (Kumubage, Kumu Bagecun;  / ) 
Sëriq (Serike;  / )
Qarangghuyar (Karangguya, Karang Guyacun;  / ) 
Ayagh qiyqu (Ayagekeyikuo;  / )
Kalayangtake (Kalayang Takecun) 
Bashbiz (Bashibizili, Bashibizilicun;  / ) 
Otturabiz (Outulabizili, Outula Bizilicun;  / ) 
Ayagh biz  (Ayagebizili;  / )
Karki (Kalake'er;  / )
Yëngi lengger (Yinglangan;  / )
Bositankule
Yingbage
Bulake
Bashikule
Ayagekelante
Nu'erluke
Kazimileke

In 2009, villages in Sampul township included:

Arimaili, Xianbaibazha, Kuoqikan, Langan, Kelante, Ayidingkule, Bashi'akemaidirisi, Ayake'akemaidirisi, Qiakemake, Jiayi'airike, Ku'erbage, Kuotazilangan, Yiledamu, Bashikeyikuo, Kumubage, Serike, Karangguya, Ayagekeyikuo, Kalayangtake, Bashibizili, Outulabizili, Ayagebizili, Kalake'er, Yinglangan, Bositankule, Yingbage

Demographics

Notes

References

Populated places in Xinjiang
Township-level divisions of Xinjiang